Yuri Mikhailovich Baturin (born 12 June 1949, in Moscow), is a Russian cosmonaut and former politician.

Baturin graduated from the Moscow Institute of Physics and Technology in 1973, and is the former Assistant to the President on National Security and Secretaty of the Defense Council (1996-1998); he is also an author in constitutional law. 
Baturin was also a cosmonaut who flew on two missions.

His first spaceflight, sometimes called Mir EP-4, was launched with the spacecraft Soyuz TM-28 13 August 1998, and landed with Soyuz TM-27. He was a Research Cosmonaut for this mission, which lasted for 11 days 19 hours 39 minutes. His second spaceflight was ISS EP-1, which was launched with the spacecraft Soyuz TM-32 on April 28, 2001, and landed with Soyuz TM-31. This mission was notable as carrying to first paying space tourist Dennis Tito. For this mission he was designated a Flight Engineer;  the mission lasted for 7 days 22 hours and 4 minutes.

He married Svetlana Veniaminovna Polubinskaya, (born 1954); they had a daughter, Alexandra Yurievna Baturina, (born 1982), a student at the Moscow State Academy of Law.

References

1949 births
Living people
1st class Active State Councillors of the Russian Federation
Russian cosmonauts
Astronaut-politicians
Moscow Institute of Physics and Technology alumni
Academic staff of the Moscow Institute of Physics and Technology
Heroes of the Russian Federation
Diplomatic Academy of the Ministry of Foreign Affairs of the Russian Federation alumni
Mir crew members
Kutafin Moscow State Law University alumni